Baumburg Abbey is a former monastery of Augustinian Canons Regular in the northern Traunstein district of Bavaria, Germany. It was founded in 1107–1109 and dissolved in 1803. 
Today Baumburg is a Catholic deanery that covers the parishes of the northern Chiemgau.

Foundation

The monastery St. Margareth zu Baumburg was founded by Count Berengar II of Sulzbach in 1107–1109 to fulfill his oath on the death of his wife Adelheid von Megling-Frontenhausen. Count Berengar appointed Eberwin as provost of the monastery. He moved Augustinian canons to the new abbey from the Berchtesgaden Provostry, which he and Eberwin had previously peopled with canons from Rottenbuch Abbey. He also appropriated property from Berchtesgaden for the new monastery. However, around 1116 Berengar let Eberwin return to Berchtesgaden to lead it again as an independent monastery.

The new provost Gottschalk  (ca. 1120–1163) of Baumburg was not at all pleased with the detachment of Berchtesgaden.
He called Eberwin an "apostate" and removed him from the dean's list. 
In addition, he was not prepared to accept the loss of the Berchtesgaden property. 
After the death of Berengar (3 December 1125) he challenged the legality of the separation of the two monasteries and appealed to the responsible bishop, Archbishop Conrad I of Salzburg (1106-1147), for an injunction to re-merge.
After an arbitration awarded by Conrad in 1136 the separation of the two monasteries as wished by Berengar was reaffirmed, and in 1142 reconfirmed by Pope Innocent II. The Baumburg claims were dismissed as the "simple-minded opinion of certain brothers".

Early years
During the tenure of Gottschalk as provost of the Baumburg Abbey (to 1163) a church of St. Nicholas was consecrated in 1129, and in 1156 the Romanesque Basilica of St. Margaret was built. Around this time the Archbishop of Salzburg made the provost of Baumburg an archdeacon. 
Thus he acted as deputy to the archbishop for the ecclesiastical jurisdiction, church oversight and asset management.
In 1185 the Pope confirmed this function.

The Augustinian canons acted primarily as pastors. 
The monastery was assigned the parishes of Baumburg-Altenmarkt, Sankt Georgen, Truchtlaching, Traunwalchen, Neuenchieming, Kienberg, Poing (now Truchtlaching) and partner churches and possessions in Lower Austria. 
The abbey school was also important, serving most of the sons of the regional nobility.
As of 1367, the provosts were also given the rights of Abbots.

Like other abbeys, in the 15th century and during the Protestant Reformation the Baumburg Abbey experienced a religious and economic decline.
More than once Baumburg was placed under administration, including between 1536 and 1538 under the provost of the Berchtesgaden Abbey and later under provost Prince Wolfgang II Griesstätter zu Haslach, provost of Höglwörth Abbey and then Prince Provost of Berchtesgaden. Between 1523 and 1539 the monastery was three times devastated by fires.
By 1579 there were only three canons lived in the abbey.

Later revival

With the end of the 16th Century Baumburg came back to life. 
The Collegiate School regained its good reputation among the nobility, and the number of canons increased again.

A Baroque transformation of the formerly Gothic buildings of the congregation began in 1600 with a renovation of the medieval church. 
The towers received their characteristic onion domes. 
The provosts Michael Doegger (r. 1688–1706) and Patricius Stöttner (r. 1707–1737) led the conversion and new construction of the monastery buildings. 
On the occasion of the 600th anniversary of consecration in 1755 the architect Franz Alois Mayr from Trostberg built the present church of St. Margareta in the Rococo style with stucco filigrees and frescoes.

The monastery was closed in 1803 during secularization by the Bavarian State. In 1812 the abbey and farm buildings as well as the abbey's properties were auctioned. 
The collegiate church now serves as a parish church for Altenmarkt an der Alz. 
Many of the monastery buildings were demolished. Since 1910 a wing of the abbey has been used as a parsonage. 
Another wing for a long time served as a convalescent home. 
Today it houses a private seminar hotel, which is often used by choirs and orchestras. 
The Baumberg Abbey brewery, established in 1612, is now also privately owned.

Gallery

Provosts
Provosts for which there are records include:

 ca. 1107/09–1116/19 Eberwin
 ca. 1116/19–1120/25 Dekan Eccolf 
 ca. 1120/25–1163/70 Gottschalk
 ca. 1163/70–1182/87 Meingot
 1187–1192 Marsilius
 ca. 1195–1205 Otto
 ca. 1217/19–1240 Eberhard
 1436–1479 Caspar Ebenhauser
 1479–1488 Paulus Pelchinger
 1488–1515 Georg I. Dietrichinger
 1517–1531 Wolfgang Viergold
 1531–1539 Administration by Wolfgang II Griesstätter zu Haslach
 1539–1578 Stephan Toblhamer
 1587–1622 Urban Stamler
 1637–1648 Johann Zehentner
 1688–1706 Michael Doegger
 1707–1737 Patritius II. Stöttner
 1748–1761 Joachim Vischer
 1761–1778 Guarinus Steininger
 1778–1789 Monastery under administration
 1786–1789 Albert I. Knoll
 1790–1801 Franz I. Krumb
 1801 – 22 March 1803 Franz II Lindemann

References
Notes

Citations

Sources

Further reading

 Walter Brugger, Anton Landersdorfer und Christian Soika: "Baumburg an der Alz". Verlag Schnell & Steiner GmbH Regensburg, 1. Auflage 2007, 
 Martin Johann Walko: Die Traditionen des Augustiener-Chorherrenstifts Baumburg (Quellen und Erörterungen zur Bayerischen Geschichte NF 44,1), München 2004
 Schmid, Katharina: "Kloster Baumburg. Entstehung und Entwicklung des klösterlichen Lebens und Wirkens in Baumburg". Erschienen im Eigenverlag, Altenmarkt 2007.

External links

 Klöster in Bayern: Baumburg – Vom Augustinerstift zum Seminarhotel
 www.Baumburg.de Klosterkirche
 Photos of the interior of the Abbey Church, in the Warburg Institute Iconographic Database

Monasteries in Bavaria